Umakant Mishra is an Indian politician. He was elected to the Lok Sabha, lower house of the Parliament of India as a member of the Indian National Congress. He died on 8 May 2014.

References

External links
 Official biographical sketch in Parliament of India website

India MPs 1980–1984
India MPs 1984–1989
Lok Sabha members from Uttar Pradesh
1927 births
Living people